Andrea Buondonno (born 21 November 1992) is an Italian rugby union player. His position is wing and as of July 2022 he played for Lyons Piacenza in Top10.

From 2016 to 2017, he played with Treviso in Pro12.
For 2021-2022 season he came back in Top10 with Colorno. 

He was named to the Italy Seven squad from 2013 to 2015.

References

External links 
It's Rugby England Profile
Eurosport Profile

1992 births
Living people
Italian rugby union players
Benetton Rugby players
Rugby union wings
Sportspeople from Milan
Rugby Viadana players
Mogliano Rugby players
Italian rugby sevens players
Rugby Colorno players